Blue Ridge Community Unit School District 18 is a school district in DeWitt County in the U.S. state of Illinois, with the district office in Farmer City and schools in Farmer City and Mansfield.

Schools
The district operates the following schools:
Ruth M. Schneider Elementary School in Farmer City
Blue Ridge Intermediate and Junior High School in Mansfield, IL
Blue Ridge High School in Farmer City

See also
List of school districts in Illinois

References

External links

School districts in Illinois
Education in DeWitt County, Illinois